Peter Lux (born 4 October 1962) is a German former professional footballer.

Career

Lux began his senior career at Eintracht Braunschweig in 1981. After the club's relegation from the Bundesliga, he transferred to Hamburger SV. In total, Lux played eight seasons in the Bundesliga for Braunschweig, Hamburg, and Waldhof Mannheim, as well as one season in the first-tier NOFV-Oberliga in former East Germany for Dynamo Dresden. He left Dresden during the winter break of the 1990–91 season to return to Braunschweig, now in the 2. Bundesliga.

International career
Lux also represented Germany at the 1984 Summer Olympics.

Honours
 Bundesliga: runner-up 1986–87
 DFB-Pokal: 1986–87

Post-retirement
After retiring as a player, Lux became a golf coach, and also managed several amateur teams in the Wolfenbüttel/Salzgitter area.

References

External links
 

1962 births
Living people
People from Salzgitter
Footballers from Lower Saxony
German footballers
German football managers
Association football midfielders
Bundesliga players
2. Bundesliga players
Eintracht Braunschweig players
Eintracht Braunschweig II players
Hamburger SV players
Dynamo Dresden players
SV Waldhof Mannheim players
Expatriate footballers in East Germany
Olympic footballers of West Germany
West German footballers
Footballers at the 1984 Summer Olympics
DDR-Oberliga players